Joseph Henry Harrison (6 March 1903 – 10 June 1960) was an Australian rules footballer who played with Richmond in the Victorian Football League (VFL).

Notes

External links 

1903 births
Australian rules footballers from Victoria (Australia)
Richmond Football Club players
1960 deaths